Elizabeth S. Hager is an American politician who is a former member of the New Hampshire House of Representatives.

Hager served on the Concord City Council for nine years and was mayor in 1988–1989.  She was first elected to the state House in 1972.  She was reelected twelve times, until losing reelection in 2008.

Hager had been mentioned as a possible appointment to the United States Senate, after Judd Gregg was nominated United States Secretary of Commerce.

Hager is a moderate Republican, who endorsed Barack Obama in the 2008 presidential election due to his pro-choice stance.  During her career, Hager has sponsored legislation protecting abortion rights.

Hager serves as the executive director of United Way of Merrimack County.

References

Republican Party members of the New Hampshire House of Representatives
Living people
Women state legislators in New Hampshire
Politicians from Concord, New Hampshire
Year of birth missing (living people)
21st-century American women